The Open Rights Group (ORG) is a UK-based organisation that works to preserve digital rights and freedoms by campaigning on digital rights issues and by fostering a community of grassroots activists. It campaigns on numerous issues including mass surveillance, internet filtering and censorship, and intellectual property rights.

History
The organisation was started by Danny O'Brien, Cory Doctorow, Ian Brown, Rufus Pollock, James Cronin, Stefan Magdalinski, Louise Ferguson and Suw Charman after a panel discussion at Open Tech 2005. O'Brien created a pledge on PledgeBank, placed on 23 July 2005, with a deadline of 25 December 2005: "I will create a standing order of 5 pounds per month to support an organisation that will campaign for digital rights in the UK but only if 1,000 other people will too." The pledge reached 1000 people on 29 November 2005. The Open Rights Group was launched at a "sell-out" meeting in Soho, London.

Work 
The group has made submissions to the All Party Internet Group (APIG) inquiry into digital rights management and the Gowers Review of Intellectual Property.

The group was honoured in the 2008 Privacy International Big Brother Awards alongside No2ID, Liberty, Genewatch UK and others, as a recognition of their efforts to keep state and corporate mass surveillance at bay.

In 2010 the group worked with 38 Degrees to oppose the introduction of the Digital Economy Act, which was passed in April 2010.

The group opposes measures in the draft Online Safety Bill introduced in 2021 that it sees as infringing free speech rights and online anonymity.

The group campaigns against the Department for Digital, Culture, Media and Sport's plan to switch to an opt-out model for cookies. The group spokesperson stated that "[t]he UK government propose to make online spying the default option" in response to the proposed switch.

Goals
 To collaborate with other digital rights and related organisations.
 To nurture a community of campaigning volunteers, from grassroots activists to technical and legal experts.
 To preserve and extend traditional civil liberties in the digital world.
 To provide a media clearinghouse, connecting journalists with experts and activists.
 To raise awareness in the media of digital rights abuses.

Areas of interest

The organisation, though focused on the impact of digital technology on the liberty of UK citizens, operates with an apparently wide range of interests within that category. Its interests include:

Access to knowledge
 Copyright
 Creative Commons
 Free and open source software
 The public domain
 Crown copyright
 Digital Restrictions Management
 Software patents

Free speech and censorship
 Internet filtering
 Right to parody
 s. 127 Communications Act 2003

Government and democracy
Electronic voting
Freedom of information legislation

Privacy, surveillance and censorship
 Automatic Vehicle Tracking
 Communications data retention
 Identity management
 Net Neutrality
 NHS patients' medical database
 Police DNA Records
 RFID

Structure
ORG has a paid staff, whose members include:
Jim Killock (Executive Director)
Javier Ruiz Diaz (Campaigner)

Former staff include Suw Charman-Anderson and Becky Hogge, both Executive Directors, e-voting coordinator Jason Kitcat, campaigner Peter Bradwell, grassroots campaigner Katie Sutton and administrator Katerina Maniadaki. The group's patron is Neil Gaiman. As of October 2019 the group had over 3,000 paying supporters.

Advisory council and board of directors
In addition to staff members and volunteers, there is an advisory panel of over thirty members, and a Board of Directors, which oversees the group's work, staff, fundraising and policy. The current board members are:

In January 2015, the Open Rights Group announced the formation of a Scottish Advisory Council which will be handling matters relating to Scottish digital rights and campaigns. The Advisory Council is made up of:

From the existing UK Advisory Council:
 Judith Rauhofer
 Keith Mitchell
 Lilian Edwards
 Wendy Grossman

And from the Open Rights Group Board:
 Milena Popova
 Owen Blacker
 Simon Phipps

One of the first projects is to raise awareness and opposition to the Scottish Identity Database.

ORGCON
ORGCON was the first ever conference dedicated to digital rights in the UK, marketed as "a crash course in digital rights". It was held for the first time in 2010 at City University in London and included keynote talks from Cory Doctorow, politicians and similar pressure groups including Liberty, NO2ID and Big Brother Watch. ORGCON has since been held in 2012, 2013, 2014, 2017, and 2019 where the keynote was given by Edward Snowden.

See also
 Campaign Against Censorship
 Censorship in the United Kingdom
 Internet censorship
 Open Genealogy Alliance

References

External links
 

Access to Knowledge movement
Articles containing video clips
Civil liberties advocacy groups
Computer law organizations
Copyright law organizations
Digital media
Digital rights management
Digital rights organizations
Election and voting-related organizations
Intellectual property activism
Intellectual property organizations
Internet in the United Kingdom
Internet privacy organizations
Internet-related activism
Organizations established in 2005
Political advocacy groups in the United Kingdom
Politics and technology
Politics of the United Kingdom
Public domain
Radio-frequency identification